Yekaterinovka is a rural locality (a selo) in Ananyevsky Selsoviet, Kulundinsky District, Altai Krai, Russia. The population was 179 as of 2013. There are 2 streets.

Geography 
Yekaterinovka is located 59 km east of Kulunda (the district's administrative centre) by road. Ananyevka is the nearest rural locality.

References 

Rural localities in Kulundinsky District